Exo's Showtime is a South Korean documentary starring the boy group Exo. It is the first season of the South Korean reality show series, Showtime.

Background
Exo's Showtime is a reality TV show that allows the fans to see behind-the-scenes of Exo's daily lives and how they act offstage.

Episodes

References

External links
Exo's Showtime at mbcplus.com

South Korean reality television series
Exo
Television series by SM C&C